The Toyota Antelopes are a basketball team based in Nagoya, Aichi, playing in the Women's Japan Basketball League.

Notable players
Kaede Kondo
Emi Kudeken
Mika Kurihara
Evelyn Mawuli
Stephanie Mawuli
Naho Miyoshi
Mucha Mori
Moeko Nagaoka
Moe Nagata
Yuko Oga
Yoshie Sakurada
Takami Takeuchi
Mai Yamamoto

Coaches
Don Beck (basketball)
Toshihiro Goto
Lucas Mondelo

References

External links
Official website

Basketball teams in Japan
Basketball teams established in 1963
1963 establishments in Japan
Sports teams in Nagoya